Stephen Birch is a Canadian health economist and professor in the Department of Health Research Methods, Evidence, and Impact at McMaster University. He is also a member of McMaster's Centre for Health Economics and Policy Analysis and visiting chair in health economics at the University of Manchester. In 2011, he was jointly ranked as the #1 cited health economics researcher in Canada by the World Bank, along with his colleague Amiram Gafni. He was educated at Sheffield University (B.A. in economics), University of Bath (M.Sc. in fiscal studies), and York University (D.Phil. in economics).

References

External links
Faculty page

Canadian economists
Health economists
Living people
Academic staff of McMaster University
Year of birth missing (living people)